The 1977 Boston University Terriers football team was an American football team that represented Boston University as a member of the Yankee Conference during the 1977 NCAA Division II football season. In their first season under head coach Rick Taylor, the Terriers compiled a 3–7 record (1–4 against conference opponents), finished in a three-way tie for last place in the conference, and were outscored by a total of 313 to 177.

Schedule

References

Boston University
Boston University Terriers football seasons
Boston University Terriers football